Christoph Auffarth (born December 14, 1951 in Mannheim) is a German religious scholar and theologian. Auffarth is a professor at the Institute of Religious Studies / Education at the University of Bremen with a focus on history and theologies of Christianity.

Biography
Auffarth spent his childhood and youth in his hometown of Mannheim, where he graduated in 1970 at the classical and musical Johann Sebastian Bach High School. He then moved to the neighbouring town of the Rhine-Neckar metropolitan region and began studying the subjects of history, Greek, Latin and archaeology at the University of Heidelberg in the winter semester 1970/71. After spending some time in Athens, Greece in 1974 (Byzantine Studies, Archeology, Greek), he moved to the University of Tübingen, where he continued his studies in history, Greek and Latin. In addition, he took the subjects of religious studies and theology. 
One day after his 24th birthday Auffarth received his first degree in 1975, the first state exam for teaching at grammar schools . His traineeship in the subjects Latin, Greek and history graduated from Auffarth Uhland Gymnasium Tübingen, 1977 followed the Second State Examination for teaching at grammar schools.

After Auffarth worked in the following years as a study assistant at the Wildermuth Gymnasium in Tübingen, he completed there a postgraduate studies in religious studies, Greek studies and theology, which in 1987 had a doctorate in religious studies to the result. The doctoral thesis was published in 1991 under the title The imminent demise. "Creation" published in myth and ritual in the ancient Orient and in Greece using the example of the Odyssey and Ezekiel book.

From 1987 Auffarth held teaching assignments for comparative religious studies at the University of Tübingen. From 1994 to 1996 he was assistant at the Department of Indology and Religious Studies at the University of Tübingen. 1995 followed the habilitation in the field of religious studies and Greek philology. Auffarth then did his doctorate again: in 1996, the Rijksuniversiteit Groningen awarded him the doctorate in theology.

Since 2001, Auffarth has been Full Professor of Religious Studies with a focus on History and Theologies of Christianity at the University of Bremen.
 
In 2010 Auffarth was selected as a fellow for a one-year research visit to the International Center for Humanities Research ( Käte-Hamburger-Kolleg ) at the Ruhr-University Bochum within the overall project Dynamics of religious history between Asia and Europe.

Career
Numerous articles in specialist encyclopaedias such as the RGG (4th edition) and anthologies point to Auffarth as a distinguished scholar (see below). The encyclopaedia Metzler Encyclopedia Religion: Everyday Life, Media, Present is one of the standard works in the field of religious studies. The International Review for Biblical Studies characterized the lexicon: "The volume is characterized by the cultural-historical orientation of the Tübingen School of Religious Studies and the publisher Auffarth and thus represents an addition to the handbook of fundamental religious concepts. The entire work deserves emphatic recommendation." The Neue Zürcher Zeitung wrote: "The use of this lexicon itself is already not only an intellectual, but also sensual pleasure."
In the Frankfurter Allgemeine Zeitung the reviewer Wolfram Kinzig praised Auffarth's book The heretics: Cathars , Waldenses and other religious movements and described the author as a "connoisseur of the topic in the Middle Ages". His book Earthly ways and heavenly reward was also discussed positively. Peter J. Bräunlein wrote in the Bavarian Yearbook for Folklore: "The material and imaginative research presented here can be read with great profit. At the same time, each page presents the power of a religious science that sees itself as cultural science. "

Works

Thesis

Books
  - published version of his 1986 University of Tübingen dissertation.

Articles and Editorships
  - (English, revised edition as The Brill Dictionary of Religion, Brill, Leiden, Boston 2006). 
 
 
with Ulrich Berner (ed.): Religious Pluralism in the Middle Ages? Visit an epoch of European religious history. Proceedings (= Religions in the Plural World, vol. 1). Lit, Berlin u. a. 2007,  . 
with Sonja Kerth (ed.): Faith dispute and laughter. Reformation and laughter culture in the Middle Ages and the Early Modern Period (= religions in the plural world, Vol. Lit, Berlin / Münster 2008,  . 
Ancient Jews and Christians quarrel within earshot: Daniel Boyarin's Borderlines in German. In: www.rpi-virtuell.net (PDF; 224 kB) (Review 2010 on Daniel Boyarin: Border Lines: The Partition of Judaeo-Christianity (= Divinations: Rereading late ancient religion ) Vol 3) University of Pennsylvania Press, Philadelphia 2004, see the [later] German translation: Daniel Boyarin: demarcations The division of Judaeo-Christianity from the English by Gesine Palmer (= Work on New Testament theology and contemporary history 1) Institute for Church and Judaism, Center for Christian-Jewish Studies / Lehrhaus eV, Berlin / Dortmund 2009). 
Births and siblings. In: www.rpi-virtuell.net (PDF, 100 kB) (Review 2010 to: Peter Schäfer : The birth of Judaism from Christianity Five lectures on the emergence of rabbinic Judaism (= Tria Corda, Vol 6) Mohr Siebeck, Tübingen 2010).

Bibliography

External links

References

1951 births
20th-century German Protestant theologians
21st-century German Protestant theologians
German biblical scholars
Living people